This a list of land patents provided by the British crown for land in what is now the state of Maine:

 Gorges-Mason Grant, 1622
 First Kennebec Patent, 1627
 Mason's Lands, 1629
 Gorges Patent, (de facto 1629; official 1639)
 Comnock's Patent, 1629
 Second Kennebec Patent (also known as the Kennebec Purchase or Plymouth Patent), 1629
 Lygonia Patent, 1630
 Muscongus Patent (also known as the Waldo Patent, and, eventually, the Bingham Purchase), 1630
 Pemaquid Patent, 1631
 Black Point Grant, 1631

See also
 Province of Maine

Pre-statehood history of Maine
Land patents